The Gribovsky G-10 was a single seat sports aircraft designed and built in the USSR in the early 1930s.

Design and development

Although the G-10 incorporated many structural feature from the earlier Gribovsky G-8 and later in its career had the same engine, it was a braced high wing monoplane rather than a low wing, cantilever design.  The G-10's two spar wing was supported over the central fuselage on a very low, faired pylon and braced to the lower fuselage on each side by a V-form pair of faired struts.

Like the G-8, the G-10 had a smoothly rounded, plywood skinned monocoque fuselage. This was carefully streamlined and integrated smoothly with the spinner of the two blade propeller, though the cylinders protruded for cooling.

The G-10 had a large cut-out in the wing trailing edge over the open cockpit, from which the pilot could see both below and above the wing. The tailplane was positioned on top of the fuselage and braced from below with two parallel struts.  The fin was almost triangular though it rounded at the top into a broad, curved, deep unbalanced rudder which extended down to the keel. The G-10 had a fixed tail skid undercarriage; each of the main wheels, enclosed in broad spats, was hinged on a pair of V-form struts to the central fuselage with a vertical, faired shock absorber from the axle to the central fuselage.

The G-10 was constructed at GAZ-1 (the state aviation factory at Moscow Khodynka Aerodrome or Central Moscow Airfield) in 1933.

Specifications (M-23 engine)

References

1930s Soviet sport aircraft
G-10
High-wing aircraft
Aircraft first flown in 1933